Dean Fiore (born 1 December 1983) is an Australian professional racing driver. Fiore competed in the 2022 Bathurst 1000 for Brad Jones Racing as a co-driver alongside Bryce Fullwood in the No. 14 Holden Commodore (ZB).

Racing career
Fiore is one of three racing brothers, along with Todd and Paul. One of a line of West Australian drivers brought up in the relatively isolated world of his home state Formula Ford series, he won the championship in 2002 and 2003. He progressed into the Australian Formula Ford Championship in 2004 and stayed there for two seasons, initially with Western Australian-based outfit Fastlane Racing. Following this he joined and raced with Sonic Motor Racing Services where he finished top five in the points both times but did not make the top three.

Transitioning into Australian Carrera Cup Championship along with his Sonic team, Fiore made steady progress, becoming a top five driver in his second season before becoming series runner-up in the 2008 Australian Carrera Cup Championship.

Fiore was speculated as a potential driver who could bring sponsorship towards a beleaguered Team Kiwi Racing in V8 Supercar and he became the first Australian to be signed as a regular driver for the pro-New Zealand racing team. However just three events into the season and Team Kiwi Racing collapsed as a V8 Supercar operation and Triple F Racing was formed to keep Fiore in the car for the remainder of the season.

For the 2012 season Fiore's team linked with Dick Johnson Racing. Fiore had his best year in V8 Supercar, including outperforming DJR teammates James Moffat and Steve Owen.

Career results

Supercars Championship results

Complete Bathurst 1000 results

References

External links 
 V8 Supercars Official Profile
 Driver Database stats
 Profile on Racing Reference

1983 births
Australian people of Italian descent
Formula Ford drivers
Living people
People from Kalgoorlie
Racing drivers from Western Australia
Supercars Championship drivers
Australian Endurance Championship drivers
Kelly Racing drivers
Nismo drivers
Audi Sport drivers
24H Series drivers